Veretenkovo is a rural locality (a village) in Denisovskoye Rural Settlement, Gorokhovetsky District, Vladimir Oblast, Russia. The population was 12 as of 2010.

Geography 
Veretenkovo is located 33 km southwest of Gorokhovets (the district's administrative centre) by road. Proletarsky is the nearest rural locality.

References 

Rural localities in Gorokhovetsky District